Oav is an Estonian surname, translated as "Squirrel". It may refer to:

People
Aivo Orav (born 1965), Estonian diplomat
Aksel Orav (1929–2003), Estonian actor
Ivo Orav, former member of Estonian band Vennaskond
Kare Orav, married name of Estonian singer Kare Kauks
Maria Orav (born 1996), Estonian footballer
Marie Orav (1911–1994), Estonian chess player
Õie Orav (born 1934), Estonian film historian, scenarist, actress and film director
Saara Orav (born 2001), Estonian tennis player

Fictional characters
Ivan Orav, fictional character created by Andrus Kivirähk

Estonian-language surnames